Stefan Schimmer (born 28 April 1994) is a German professional footballer who plays as a forward for 1. FC Heidenheim.

Career 
Schimmer started his career at FC Gundelfingen, before, in 2016, he signed for FC Memmingen. In June 2017, he joined newly-promoted 3. Liga club SpVgg Unterhaching.

On 6 August 2019, Schimmer signed for 2. Bundesliga club 1. FC Heidenheim from SpVgg Unterhaching. He made his debut for Heidenheim on 18 August 2019, coming on as a 64th minute substitute for Marc Schnatterer in a 2–1 away defeat against Dynamo Dresden.

References

External links
 
 

1994 births
Living people
German footballers
Association football forwards
SpVgg Unterhaching players
1. FC Heidenheim players
Regionalliga players
3. Liga players
FC Memmingen players
2. Bundesliga players